This list of mountains and hills in the Elbe Sandstone Mountains contains a selection of the highest mountains, hills and crags in the Elbe Sandstone Mountains that straddle the German-Czech border.

The key to abbreviations in the table is given below.

Key
The abbreviations used in the table (in alphabetical order) are:
 NP = National Park – Saxon Switzerland National Park and Bohemian Switzerland National Park (Národní park České Švýcarsko)
 PLA = Protected landscape area Labské pískovce

See also
 List of mountains in the Czech Republic
 List of mountains in Saxony
 List of the highest mountains of Germany
 List of the highest mountains in the German states

Elbe Sandstone Mountains